A Woo Woo is an alcoholic beverage made of vodka, peach schnapps, and cranberry juice.

Woo Woo may also refer to:

"Woo-Woo" (song), a boogie woogie song by Harry James and the Boogie Woogie Trio
Ronnie Woo Woo Wickers (born 1941), a fan at Chicago Cubs baseball games
A term used by magician and skeptic James Randi to denote paranormal, supernatural and occult claims
Woowoo, a Caribbean drum
"Woo-Woo", a song by Sheryl Crow on her 2017 album Be Myself

See also
"You Should Be Mine (The Woo Woo Song)", a 1986 song by Jeffrey Osborne from the album Emotional
Kitchen Party (group), a British girl group formerly known as The WooWoos
Woo (disambiguation)